Animal Practice is an American sitcom television series which aired on NBC from August 12 to October 24, 2012, on the network's Fall 2012 television schedule. The series premiered after the end of the 2012 Olympic games (which the network was showing) and was produced by Universal Television and American Work. The series starred Justin Kirk and is set at a veterinary office.
The series was canceled on October 18, 2012, due to low ratings, and replaced by Whitney on November 14, 2012. A total of nine episodes were produced, and the three unaired episodes were released on NBC.com and Hulu on November 20, 2012.

Cast and characters

Main cast and characters
 Justin Kirk as Dr. George Coleman
 Wyatt Oleff as Young George
 Joanna García Swisher as Dorothy Crane
 Bobby Lee as Dr. Robert Yamamoto
 Kym Whitley as Juanita
 Betsy Sodaro as Angela
 Tyler Labine as Dr. Doug Jackson
 Crystal the Monkey as Dr. Rizzo

Recurring cast and characters
 June Diane Raphael as Dr. Jill Leiter
 Brian Huskey as Nurse Howard

Development and production
The show was originally known as Animal Kingdom when it was in development. The network placed a series order in May 2012. 
Amy Huberman played the role of "Dorothy Crane" in the original pilot; however, the role was recast with Joanna García.

Crystal the Monkey's character was originally known as "Dr. Zaius" but the rights to the name could not be obtained. At the time of production, Crystal was known for her appearances in a number of motion pictures, most notably the Night at the Museum series.

Marco Pennette replaced Gail Lerner as showrunner after the third episode had been shot.

Promotion 

While promoting the show to ad buyers, NBC told them that "Crystal" the capuchin had had "powerful reception among test audiences", and "is perhaps the best-known element about the new show—and, maybe, NBC's entire fall season."

NBC ran a sneak preview of the series on August 12, 2012, as a lead-out for the closing ceremony of the 2012 Summer Olympics; controversially, the already tape-delayed and abridged broadcast was interrupted to air the pilot, causing the finale (which featured a performance by The Who) to be preempted after late local newscasts.

Episodes

Reception
According to Metacritic, the show has received a score of 48/100 and mixed critical reviews. Drusilla Moorhouse, of entertainment news website Zap2It, wrote that "It's too cringe-worthy for overempathizing animal lovers, but general audiences might tune in for a lighthearted, escapist laugh." While Moorhouse's review was more positive, Robert Bianco of USA Today gave a negative review, stating "The shame is that Practice has a fine human cast...but Kirk and his cohorts quickly get taken down by the barrage of stupidity the show sends their way."

Awards and accolades

International broadcasts
In the UK, Animal Practice aired on ITV2 beginning February 11, 2013.

See also
 Mr. Smith, a short-lived 1983 NBC sitcom featuring an orangutan

References

External links

2012 American television series debuts
2012 American television series endings
2010s American medical television series
2010s American single-camera sitcoms
2010s American workplace comedy television series
English-language television shows
NBC original programming
Television series about monkeys
Television series by Universal Television
Television shows set in New York City
Television shows scored by Ludwig Göransson